My Other Husband is a 1983 French romantic comedy film directed by Georges Lautner.

Plot
Before the film begins, Alice unintentionally acquires two husbands: airplane pilot Philippe and teacher Vincent. She married Philippe first and they never officially divorced. Years later she began living with Vincent. She has children with each man and lives parallel lives in two different cities. Eventually, each "husband" learns of the other's existence—leading to a competition between the two of them for Alice's affections.

Cast 
Miou-Miou as Alice
Roger Hanin as Philippe
Eddy Mitchell as Vincent
Rachid Ferrache as Simon
Ingrid Lurienne as Pauline
Dominique Lavanant as Solange
Charlotte de Turckheim as Cynthia
François Perrot as Nicolas

External links 

1983 romantic comedy films
1983 films
Films directed by Georges Lautner
French romantic comedy films
1980s French films